The Philippine Senate Committee on Agriculture, Food and Agrarian Reform is a standing committee of the Senate of the Philippines.

This committee was formed after the Committee on Agriculture and Food and the Committee on Agrarian Reform were merged on September 3, 2019, pursuant to Senate Resolution No. 9 of the 18th Congress.

Jurisdiction 
According to the Rules of the Senate, the committee handles all matters relating to:

 Agriculture, food production and agri-business, including agricultural experimental stations, agricultural economics and research
 Soil survey and conservation
 Agricultural education
 Technical extension services
 Animal husbandry
 Livestock quarantine
 Agricultural support price
 Fisheries and aquatic resources
 Agrarian reform
 Landed estates
 Implementation of the agrarian land reform provisions of the Constitution

Members, 19th Congress 
Based on the Rules of the Senate, the Senate Committee on Agriculture, Food and Agrarian Reform has 15 members.

The President Pro Tempore, the Majority Floor Leader, and the Minority Floor Leader are ex officio members.

Here are the members of the committee in the 19th Congress as of January 10, 2023:

Committee secretary: Philip M. Lina

See also 

 List of Philippine Senate committees

References 

Agriculture
Agriculture in the Philippines